Caudellia apyrella, the crescent-winged caudellia moth, is a species of snout moth in the genus Caudellia. It was described by Harrison Gray Dyar Jr. in 1904 in honor of his colleague Andrew Nelson Caudell. It is found in North America.

The larvae feed on Cuscuta compacta and Cuscuta gronovii.

References

Moths described in 1904
Phycitinae